Jeremy Hindley (1 January 1944 – 7 January 2013) was an English horse trainer who trained around 700 winners in a 17-year career.

He trained horses such as Protection Racket, who won the Irish St. Leger, The Go-Between, who won 11 starts at the Cornwallis Stakes, and Crash Course, winner of the Doncaster Cup

Hindley died on 7 January 2013, at the age 69 at his home in Hermanus, South Africa, after suffering from Motor neurone disease since 2001.

References

1944 births
2013 deaths
Deaths from motor neuron disease
Neurological disease deaths in South Africa
British racehorse trainers